Angadi is a 1980 Indian Malayalam-language action drama film directed by I. V. Sasi, written by T. Damodaran and written by P. V, Gangadharan under the banner of Grihalakshmi Productions. The film stars Jayan as Babu in the lead role along with Sukumaran, Seema, Jose and Sankaradi, in supporting roles. The film revolves around the rivalry between a laborer, Babu and Beeran (Balan K. Nair), an evil businessman. The music was composed by Shyam, with the cinematography done jointly by Chandramohan and C. E. Babu. Angadi was one of the major successes of the year 1980, running for 125 days in theatres. The film broke the box office record of Jayan's Sarapancharam (1979) and emerged the highest grossing Malayalam film of the year. The film was a milestone in the Malayalam film industry, achieving cult status in Kerala. The film was instrumental in establishing Jayan's macho hero image.

Cast

Jayan as Babu
Sukumaran as Gopi
Seema as Sindhu 
Jose as Haneefa
Sankaradi as Adv. Karunakaran
Raghavan as SI Ravi
Prathapachandran as Setu 
Ambika as Ayisha
Balan K. Nair as Beeran
Bhaskara Kurup as Police constable Hamsa 
KPAC Sunny as Vishvanathan
Kunchan as Krishnankutty
Kunjandi as Mammadikka
Kuthiravattam Pappu as Abu
Kuttyedathi Vilasini as Khadeeja
Nanditha Bose as Neelam
Ravikumar as Biju
Santha Devi as Amina
Suchitra as Rani
Surekha as Karthi
Vasu Pradeep as Salim, Babu's father 
Nellikode Bhaskaran as Anto
Anuradha as Dancer
Silk Smitha as Sainaba
Master Suresh as Haneefa's brother

Soundtrack
The music was composed by Shyam and the lyrics were written by Bichu Thirumala.

Reception
Angadi performed well at the box office. It was also noted for Jayan's acting. His dialogue "We are not beggars ..." became a catchphrase.

The songs from the film also made it big for their melodious renditions. With the music composed by Shyam, the film's duet, "Kannum Kannum Thammil Thammil", sung by K. J. Yesudas and S. Janaki and "Paavada Venam", sung by K. J Yesudas were instant hits. The lyrics by Bichu Thirumala was also very memorable.

References

External links
 

1980s Malayalam-language films
1980 films
Indian action drama films
Films shot in Kozhikode
Films directed by I. V. Sasi
Films scored by Shyam (composer)